Merwin Coad (born September 28, 1924) is a former Democratic U.S. Representative from Iowa's 6th congressional district for six years, serving from January 1957 to January 1963. His election snapped the Republican Party's fourteen-year hold on every U.S. House seat from Iowa. Coad is the earliest-serving living member of the House, having been first elected in 1956.

Personal background
Born in Cawker City, Kansas, Coad moved with his parents to a farm near Auburn, Nebraska. He graduated from high school in Auburn in 1941.
He attended Peru State Teachers College in Peru, Nebraska in 1941 and 1942, and Phillips University in Enid, Oklahoma from 1942 to 1944, and then graduated from Texas Christian University at Fort Worth, Texas in 1945. He also studied at Drake University in Des Moines, Iowa.

Coad was ordained to the ministry of Disciples of Christ Church, in Boone, Iowa, in 1945. He served as associate minister in St. Joseph, Missouri, in 1948 and 1949, as a Minister at Lenox, Iowa from 1949 to 1951, and as a Minister in Boone, from 1951 to 1956.

Election and re-election to Congress
In 1956, Coad ran as a Democrat against six-term incumbent Republican Congressman James I. Dolliver.  Coad's initial margin of victory was 83 votes out of over 129,000 votes cast, prompting a recount (which reaffirmed his victory with a margin of 198 votes). Dolliver then tried and failed to convince the U.S. House to overturn the election. Coad would win re-election twice.

Withdrawal from politics
The 1960 census caused Iowa to lose a seat in Congress, and the 1961 Iowa Legislature's resulting reapportionment placed parts of the old 6th congressional district into several districts. Coad's home county (Boone) was included in Iowa's 5th congressional district, which had been represented since 1959 by popular fellow Democrat Neal Smith.

There were reports that Coad was considering a 1962 bid for either the Senate or the Iowa governorship. However, on June 8, 1961, Coad, then only 36, announced that he was withdrawing from politics, effective at the end of his current term (in 1962).  Coad gave no reasons. However, it was soon front-page news that the former minister had obtained an Alabama divorce from his Iowa wife in March 1961, allegedly without first notifying her, and that in May 1961, Coad had married Carol Peters, a member of his staff who had just obtained a Nevada divorce from Coad's executive assistant. She then received a raise, making her his highest-paid staffer. Meanwhile, stories of Coad's financial problems, including gambling debts, and losses from his grain market investments, were published in the Des Moines Register and Time Magazine.

Before his term ended in 1962, Coad considered moving to Carroll County and running for the seat in the 7th congressional district then held by thirteen-term Representative Ben F. Jensen. In the end, however, he stayed out of the 1962 race. Coad's congressional service, which began on January 3, 1957, ended on January 3, 1963.

Activities after Congress
In July 1963 Coad began working in the Kennedy Administration as a $75-per-day consultant for the Agency for International Development's office of material resources. However, when Iowa Senator Bourke Hickenlooper — serving as the ranking Republican on the Senate Foreign Relations Committee — learned of this, he contacted the head of the agency and raised an objection, based on what he described as Coad's "background and history and utter lack of qualifications for the job." Coad resigned the next day, and flew to Iowa to blast his critics.

Coad then became involved in real estate lending in the Washington D.C. area, but by the late 1960s he faced at least one civil suit, and later a grand jury investigation. In one civil suit U.S. District Court Judge John Sirica enjoined Coad from foreclosing on the plaintiff's home, reportedly stating, "This is a racket . . . That's all it is, just a racket."

By the early 1980s, Coad was speaking at free seminars, marketed in newspaper advertisements with the headline, "You Can Buy Real Estate with $10 Down and Become Wealthy in your Spare Time." One such ad stated that Coad was "America's most effective and dynamic instructor on real estate and is the foremost consultant on no money down purchasing techniques."

He is a resident of Washington, D.C., and Harpers Ferry, West Virginia, and now promotes on-line training courses in real estate investing.

References

|-

1924 births
Living people
Peru State College alumni
Phillips University alumni
Texas Christian University alumni
Drake University alumni
Democratic Party members of the United States House of Representatives from Iowa
People from Mitchell County, Kansas
People from Auburn, Nebraska